Atod AB/LG Software AB (also known as 42-Bit AB) was a video game developer located in Helsingborg, Sweden.

History

CrossTechnics/Atod Design KB/Atod AB era
It was established in 1987 as CrossTechnics, and was formally incorporated as Atod Design KB and Atod AB in 1992 by the game development duo Christofer Nilsson and Thomas Liljetoft.

Warthog Sweden/42-bit AB era
In 2003, Atod AB was merged with British game developer Warthog Games and renamed to Warthog Sweden.

Eidos Studios, Sweden AB era
In May 2006, the company was acquired by British publisher and developer Eidos Interactive and became Eidos Studios, Sweden AB.

Today the company is part of Square Enix who acquired Eidos Interactive in 2009.

Games

ATOD AB era
Hot Wheels Extreme Racing (Sony PlayStation, 2001, published by THQ)
Mobil 1 Rally Championship (Sony PlayStation, 2000, published by Electronic Arts)
Tom & Jerry - House Trap (Sony PlayStation, 2000–11)
Tom & Jerry - Mouse Attacks (Game Boy Color, 2000-12-25)
Tiny Toon Adventures: Wacky Stackers (Game Boy Advance)
Tiny Toon Adventures: Plucky's Big Adventure (Playstation, 2001–09)
Tiny Toon Adventures: Buster Saves the Day (Game Boy Color, 2001–06)
Starlancer (PC, Dreamcast, 2000–04)
Star Trek: Invasion! (Playstation, 2000–10)
Astérix: The Gallic War (PC, Playstation, 2000–04)
Rally Championship Xtreme (2001-11-02, PC, Gamecube, Playstation 2)
Jeremy McGrath Supercross '98 (Sony PlayStation, 1998, published by Acclaim)
HeXen (Sega Saturn, 1996, published by GT Interactive / id Software)
Bugs Bunny in Double Trouble (Mega Drive and Game Gear, 1996, published by Sega)
The Pagemaster (Mega Drive, 1994, published by 20th Century Fox)
The Lawnmower Man 3D Subgame (Mega Drive, 1993, published by SCI / Time Warner)
Edge (Amiga, 1993, published by Inovatronics)
Troddlers (Amiga / Super NES, 1992 /1993, published by SCI)
Sankt Thomas (Amiga, 1992, published by Sphinx Software)
Paramax (Amiga, 1991, published by Kingsoft)
Intact (Amiga, 1990, published by Sphinx Software)
Wizmo (Amiga / Atari ST, 1989, published by Kingsoft)
Hamte Dampte (ZX Spectrum, 1987, published by Firebird)

Warthog Sweden/42-Bit AB era
Richard Burns Rally (2004, PC, Xbox, Playstation 2)
Mace Griffin Bounty Hunter (2003, PC, Xbox, Gamecube, Playstation 2)
X2: Wolverine's Revenge (2003, Playstation 2)
Pirate Adventure (WAP)
Aventureland (WAP)

References

External links
ATOD AB
Warthog Sweden/42-Bit AB
Official site of Eidos Studios Sweden
ATOD Company site on Moby Games

Defunct video game companies of Sweden
Video game companies established in 1987
Video game companies disestablished in 2003
Video game development companies